Aleksinački Bujmir is a village in Serbia situated in the  municipality of Aleksinac, in the Nišava District. The population of the village was 557 people at the 2002 census.

Demographics
In the village Aleksinački Bujmir there were 467 adult inhabitants, and the average age was 41.2 years (41.1 for men and 41.2 for women). The village had 188 households, and the average number of members per household was 2.96.

This village was almost entirely inhabited by Serbs according to the census of 2002, and in the last three censuses, there was a slight decrease in the number of inhabitants.

Populated places in Nišava District